Paradise Music Festival (or simply known as Paradise) is an annual three day camping music festival held in the last weekend of November at Lake Mountain Alpine Resort, located in Victoria, Australia approximately 120 kilometres from Melbourne. The festival was first held in 2013 and has been operating for  years.

No festival was held in 2020.

Description
Paradise is characterised as a boutique festival. Capped at 2000 attendees, the event hosts a large number of Australian artists that span from various genres, including many unsigned artists. The event also displays a range of artworks and installation art from emerging visual artists.

The festival site overlooks Great Dividing Range and Alpine National Park. In previous years, the layout of the festival has involved two areas, an outdoor amphitheatre, "Stage Paradise" and "Clubland," a venue designed for night-time performances.

Artist lineups by year

2013 

 Glass Towers
 Elizabeth Rose
 Millions
 Oisima
 Naysayer & Gilsun (DJ Set)
 Client Liaison
 Forces
 friendships
 Albert Salt
 Alta
 Animaux
 B.O.O.M.A
 Dark Arts Darts
 David
 Deer
 Deja
 Donny Benet
 Electric Sea Spider
 Glass Mirrors
 Godwolf
 Hollow Everdaze
 House of Laurence
 Hug Therapist
 I’ll’s
 Kate Martin
 Leaks
 LUCIANBLOMKAMP
 Michael Ozone
 Mu-Gen
 Namine
 NO ZU
 OSKR
 Planete
 Post Percy
 SILETJAY
 SOCCER LEGENDS
 Squarehead
 The Demon Parade
 The McQueens
 The Red Lights
 The Supporters
 Them Swoops
 Wafia

2014

 Kirin J. Callinan
 Oscar Key Sung
 Crooked Colours
 Young Franco
 Drunk Mums
 Rat & Co
 UV boi
 Silent Jay
 LUCIANBLOMKAMP
 The Sinking Teeth
 Banoffee
 Kllo
 friendships
 JPS
 I’lls
 Kirkis
 Apart From This
 Otologic
 Tranter
 Deer
 Total Giovanni
 Planete
 Ecs
 Lanks
 Darcy Baylis
 Air Max 97
 CC: DISCO!
 Rara
 Hubert Clarke Jr
 Foreign/National
 Jahnne
 Null
 Urban Problems
 Harold
 Femi

2015

 Roland Tings
 My Disco
 Lurch & Chief
 Black Cab
 Black Vanilla
 Tired Lion
 Kirkis
 Cassius Select
 The Harpoons
 Flyying Colours
 SMILE
 Dorsal Fins
 friendships
 Darts
 Totally Mild
 Catlips
 Oslow
 Jaala
 Null
 Habits
 The Infants
 Strict Face
 Leisure Suite
 DEER
 Cale Sexton
 Alta
 Tiny Little Houses
 Broadway Sounds
 Andrei Eremin
 0.1
 Marcus Whale
 Amateur Dance
 Neighbourhood Youth
 Good Morning
 ASDASFR BAWD
 Post Percy 
 Misty Nights 
 Nutrition 
 The Completely Biys 
 IO 
 Thomas Touche

2016

 Gold Class
 Harvey Sutherland & Bermuda
 Baro
 Pearls 
 GL
 LUCIANBLOMKAMP 
 Sui Zhen
 Gabriella Cohen
 Fortunes
 Julia Jacklin
 Lossless 
 BUOY 
 Krakatau 
 Alice Ivy
 SAATSUMA 
 Corin 
 Simona Castricum
 Christopher Port
 Nali 
 Huntly 
 Kangaroo Skull 
 OCDANTAR 
 Couture
 SHOUSE
 Dannika
 River Yarra
 Tom Baker
 Jalé
 DJ Kiti
 Mu-Gen
 Paradise DJs

References

External links
Paradise Music Festival

Music festivals in Australia
Festivals in Victoria (Australia)